This is an alphabetized list of notable musicians who play or played jazz organ.
Category is listed as:  jazz organists .

External links
 The Hammond Jazz Inventory
 Jazz Organ History
 International Archives for the Jazz Organ

 
Jazz
Organists